Drobot may refer to:

People with the surname
John Drobot (1926–1998), Canadian politician
Maria Drobot (born 1982), Russian politician 
Mark Drobot (born 1986), Ukrainian actor
Michael Drobot, American entrepreneur and hospital administrator

Fiction
Drobot, a character from the Skylanders game series

See also
 Drobo, a manufacturer of external computer storage devices
 Drobo, Ghana